Central Bus Station, Hyderabad, popularly known as CBS, located near Gowliguda. It was constructed during Nizam-VII Mir Osman Ali Khan era in 1930 for the maintenance of Mississippi Aircraft. In 1932, It was handed over to Nizam Road Transport services and changed the name into Gowliguda Bus Stand from then Bus Services started to Various parts of State. It collapsed by itself on 4 July 2018, after having been abandoned a week before.

History

Services

References

Transport in Telangana
Bus stations in Telangana
Transport in Hyderabad, India
Buildings and structures in Hyderabad, India